Lioprosopa rhodobaphella is a species of snout moth in the genus Lioprosopa. It was described by Ragonot in 1888, and is known from Queensland, Australia; New Guinea, Celebes and Sangir Island, Indonesia.

References

Moths described in 1888
Anerastiini